Psara ferruginalis is a moth of the family Crambidae described by Max Saalmüller in 1880. It is found on Madagascar and Réunion.

It has a wingspan of 20 mm.

Host plants of this species are Stenotaphrum dimidiatum (Poaceae).

References

Moths described in 1880
Spilomelinae
Moths of Madagascar
Moths of Réunion